Thomas P. Rona (1923–1997) was a 1980s era science advisor to the Defense Department and the White House under Presidents Reagan and Bush.

Born on  January 7, 1923, in Budapest, Hungary, Rona graduated from École supérieure d'électricité in Paris (M.E., 1943; E.E., 1945) and Massachusetts Institute of Technology (M.S. in E.E.; Sc.D. in E.E., 1955). He received his license certificate in physical electronics at the Sorbonne in 1946.  The author of several books and articles with his best known probably being Our Changing Geo-Political Premises published in 1982.  Dr. Rona is also credited by some with coining the term of Information War or warfare which he used in a report entitled "Weapon Systems and Information War" delivered to Boeing in 1976. He worked in Seattle, Washington for the Boeing Company from 1959 to 1984. The actual originator of the term "information war" is Dale Minor, a news reporter, journalist and author of the book entitled "The Information War" published in 1970 by Hawthorne Books, Inc.

During the 1980s, Dr. Rona held various posts in the Executive Branch to include Special Assistant for Space Policy at the Department of Defense, 1984 to 1986 and Assistant Director for Government Programs in the Office of Science and Technology Policy at the White House, 1986 to 1987.  On June 16, 1987, President Ronald Reagan announced Rona's nomination as Associate Director of the Office of Science and Technology Policy. 
 
In June 1989 he briefly succeeded Dr. William Graham by becoming Acting Science Advisor to President George H. W. Bush, a position he held until President Bush's choice was available in August of that year.  When Rona left government service, he did private consulting work in the general area of Information Warfare for companies such as Aegis Research Corporation then headquartered in Rosslyn, Virginia.

Rona died at his home in Bethesda, Maryland, on December 27, 1997, from hypertensive cardiovascular disease.

References

1923 births
1997 deaths
American civil servants
MIT School of Engineering alumni
University of Paris alumni
Hungarian expatriates in France
Hungarian emigrants to the United States
Directors of the Office of Science and Technology Policy